Naranath Branthan (The madman of Naranam) is a character in Malayalam folklore. He was considered to be a divine person, a Mukhta who pretended to be mad. His chief activity consisted of rolling a big stone up a hill and then letting it fall back down. There is a large statue of Naranath in Pattambi, Palakkad district of Kerala where he is believed to have lived.

Naranathu was born as the son of Vararuchi, the famous astrologer who adorned the court of Vikrama. Naranathu was one among the twelve offspring or the Parayi Petta Panthirukulam(12 children born from the Pariah woman), of Vararuchi and was brought up in the Naranathu Mangalathu Mana, situated at Chethallur in Palakkad. Naranthu came to Thiruvegappura for mastering 'Vedas'. Thiruvegappura and the nearby Rayiranelloor Mountain, which is known as 'Branthachalam', became his usual abode. Due to his strange behaviour and odd activities, people perceived him as 'mad'. At Rayiranellor Mountain he had the vision of the Devi (Goddess), and later for the benevolence of the people he enshrined Devi in the Mountain and started his worship there. No clear descriptions have yet been received of Naranath's last days. 

The most famous facet of Naranath's life is his apparently eccentric habit of rolling big stones up the hill and letting them roll down back and laughing thunderously on seeing this sight. However, this act has been often considered allegorical and has been applied for social critiquing for myriad contexts.

The Naranathu Branthan Mala (hill) is located at Rayiranelloor in Palakkad district on the Valanchery - Pattambi road after Thiruvegappura Shiv temple. It takes 1.5 hours to climb the hill. Many climb the hill during the 1st of Thulam (mid-October). On top, there is a statue of Naranathu Branthan. The nearest railhead is Kuttipuram in Malappuram district on the Shornur - Kozhikode route. He is revered as a saint by some communities in the state and is often portrayed as a mischievous trickster.

Stories of Naranath Bhranthan

Story of Sri Rama Temple at Thriprayar
One day Naranathu came to worship at the temple of Triprayar. He was surprised to see the movement of the altar stone, yet fathomed the reason through his yogic powers. He called the temple Tantri and had a nail driven on the stone, chanting mantras. The movement stopped forthwith. The portion where the nail was thrust can be seen even today.

In order to prevent any decline in the power of the idol on account of the change in its location, Naranathu also arranged to install two goddesses on either side of the deity: Sri Devi on the right and Bhumi Devi on the left.

Story of Naranath Bhranthan and Bhadrakali

Another of the popular stories which are associated with Naranath goes as follows.
The deity or the female goddess bhadrakaali ( as in the story of Kalidasa) goes out of the temple, 
She performs a dance called chutalanritha, accompanied by some of her assistants.

Once Goddess Bhadrakali went to a graveyard and saw Naranath sleeping there.
They had to perform that dance so the goddess sent her accomplices to scare him off that spot. Her accomplices tried to scare him with their most terrifying faces, but after seeing them he began laughing.
So the goddess herself appeared before him and offered to grant boons to him in return for him leaving the ground. But Naranath declined to accept the offer. But the goddess persuaded him to ask something for her satisfaction. He then asked the Goddess to make his lifespan increase by one day. The goddess told him that she didn't have the power to do so. Then he asked her to decrease his lifespan by one day. The goddess was unable to grant that too. Laughing at this, Naranath asked the Goddess to shift the swelling Manth(Malayalam) from his left leg to right leg, which the goddess readily did.

In yet another story a man wanted Naranath to be his Guru and followed him. As a good disciple, he wished to do everything his Guru did. Naranath told him to go away but the disciple stuck on. After walking for long their mouths were parched and there was no water source nearby. Naranath spotted a blacksmith and asked him to give him molten metal to drink, and he drank it. The disciple was sure that he himself couldn't do it. And Naranath told him to go away.

Story of Naranath Bhranthan and Ambalappuzha Sri Krishna Temple

The swayambhu idol of Lord Sri Krishna installed in Ambalappuzha Sri Krishna Swami Temple, Ambalappuzha, in Alappuzha District of Kerala is said to be installed by Naranathu Bhranthan. The story goes like this: The swayambhu idol of Sri Krishna was installed by some other Brahman initially and the temple poojas used to go on as usual for only a few days.  Each day for nirmalyam the melshanthi, the chief priest of the temple used to open the nada (the door of sanctum sanctorum) with fear in mind if the idol would be intact or if he would see it fallen.  Once found fallen reinstallation would be conducted after a ritual.  Frustrated with the repeated incidence the temple authorities decided to know the reason behind it and conducted a devaprashnam before reinstallation and in the devaprashnam it was observed that only Naranathu Bhranthan could install the idol permanently.  The authorities sought for him and got him through with half mind because he was always in dirty upkeep and attire and chewing pan.  As it came up in devaprashnam they had no option. Naranathu too tried to fix the idol on the platform but each time it used to fall off. When it happened over and over again and meanwhile his mouth was full of pan spit he spat into the slot on the platform and uttered, ‘irikkeda pulayadimone avide’ meaning: ‘sit there you, son of a pulayi’ and the idol got fixed. The slot full of betel leaf (taamboolam) spit spilled over the slot and hence the place got the name ‘Taamboolappuzha’ which later got distorted to ‘Ambalappuzha’.  It is believed that there was no change in the installation after that and this also confirms that Naranathu was an incarnation of Lord Vishnu.

Pranthan Kunnu village
Pranthan Kunnu or Branthan Kunnu is a small village between Karimbam and Taliparamba in Kannur district of Kerala, India.  This village is located on the back side of Sir Syed College, Taliparamba. The etymology of the village name is based upon the vast emptiness of the area in ancient times when foxes used to roam and cry giving the place an odd reputation.

Contemporary Literature

Naranath Branthan is the title character of an acclaimed poem by V. Madhusoodhanan Nair.

See also
 Parayi petta panthirukulam
 Sisyphus, a similar character

References

External links
 A tribute to Naranath and Branthachalam Temple at Kaippuram
 Story of Naranath Branthan
 Bhagavathi Temple situated near Naranathu Branthachalam Temple

 Culture of Kerala
Characters in Hindu mythology
 Kerala society
 Kerala folklore